The 1980 Bulgarian Cup Final was the 40th final of the Bulgarian Cup (in this period the tournament was named Cup of the Soviet Army), and was contested between Slavia Sofia and Beroe Stara Zagora on 13 May 1980 at Vasil Levski National Stadium in Sofia. Slavia won the final 3–1.

Match

Details

See also
1979–80 A Group

References

Bulgarian Cup finals
PFC Slavia Sofia matches
Cup Final